Subray Rama Nayak (born 1 January 1944) was elevated as a judge of high court of Karnataka state, India, on 25 February 1994 and subsequently he was sworn in as judge of high court of Andhra Pradesh state, India, on 21 March 1994.  He was transferred back to Karnataka High Court and was sworn in as a Judge of Karnataka High Court on 2 January 2003. He was the acting chief justice of Karnataka High Court from 20 October 2004 to 19 November 2004.

Early life 
Nayak was born in the Uttara Kannada district  Naadumaskeri village into a Nadavaru family, [ an agriculturists and freedom fighters' family. ]  His mother Nagamma Rama Nayak and father Rama Ranga Nayak along with other families from Ankola region were imprisoned by the British Government for having participated in Quit India Movement, a part of freedom struggle of India.

Education 
He completed his primary education from his native place and high school from Janata Vidyalaya, Dandeli. He received a B.Sc. degree  and a LL.B. degree from Mysore University, and LL.M. degree from Bangalore University. Nayak was a part-time lecturer of law from 1975 until he was elevated to the bench. He taught at B.M.S. College of Law, Basavanagudi, Bangalore, and S.L.S.R.C., Havanur College of Law, Bangalore.

As Justices 
Nayak assumed charge of the office chief justice of high court of Chhattisgarh state, India at Bilaspur on 17 November 2005. He retired on 1 January 2007.

After his retirement as chief justice, Nayak had two politically appointed positions under the Congress rule in Karnataka. Justice Nayak was appointed as the First Chairperson of the newly formed Karnataka State Human Rights Commission from 2007 to 2012. Justice Nayak was appointed as the chairperson of the Law commission of Karnataka in June 2014 till June 2019. The Kannada University at Hampi conferred on him the Naadoja award,[3] in January 2008. The Bangalore University conferred on him the honorary doctorate (laws) in May 2009.

Awards 
The Kannada University at Hampi conferred on him the Naadoja award, The Bangalore University conferred on him the honorary doctorate (laws) in May 2009 and Other Awards.

Photos Gallery

References

Sources
 Judicial Activism or Judicial Tyranny, S. R. Nayak Former Chief Justice, High Court of Chhattisgarh

1944 births
Living people
People from Uttara Kannada
University of Mysore alumni
Judges of the Andhra Pradesh High Court
Judges of the Karnataka High Court
Chief Justices of Chhattisgarh High Court